The Palestinian Territories competed as Palestine at the 2012 Summer Paralympics in London, United Kingdom, from August 29 to September 9.

The country was represented by two athletes, both in field events in athletics. Khamis Zaqout, a wheelchair athlete, competed in the discus, javelin and shot put. He had been described as Palestine's "best hope for a Paralympic medal in London". Mohammed Fannouna, who is partially sighted, competed in the long jump; he won a bronze medal in the 2004 Paralympics in Athens.

Athletics 

Men's Track and Road Events

Men's Field Events

See also
Summer Paralympic disability classification
Palestine at the Paralympics
Palestine at the 2012 Summer Olympics

Notes

Nations at the 2012 Summer Paralympics
2012
Para